Mighty Mo may refer to:
 The Missouri River
 USS Missouri (BB-63)
 Mighty Mo (food), sandwich originating in Washington, D.C. 
 Mighty Mo (kickboxer) (born 1970)
 Maurice Hooker, (born 1989), American boxer
 Mighty Mo Rodgers, (born 1942), American musician